Sodium bicarbonate cotransporter 3 is a protein which in humans is encoded by the SLC4A7 gene.

See also
 Solute carrier family

References

Further reading

Solute carrier family